Hajji Beyk-e Sofla (also Romanized as Ḩājjī Beyk-e Soflá and Ḩājjī Beyg-e Soflá; also known as Ḩājjī Beyk-e Pā’īn) is a village in Zavkuh Rural District, Pishkamar District, Kalaleh County, Golestan Province, Iran. At the 2006 census, its population was 619, in 115 families.

References 

Populated places in Kalaleh County